Pediocactus winkleri, commonly known as Winkler's cactus or Winkler's pincushion cactus, is a small cactus endemic to the state of Utah in the United States. It is known only from Emery and Wayne Counties.

The cactus is shaped like a small ribbed ball. It has 9 to 14 short radial spines each 1.5 – 4 mm long. The flowers range from peach to pink in color. The cactus is cold-hardy and are native to high altitude sandy hilltops and slopes.

This cactus was first documented in the early 1960s by Mrs. Agnes Winkler who was traveling with her then teenage son, Jim Winkler, in Utah's San Rafael Swell. Dr. Lyman Benson had earlier named a species that was then thought to be the same or that was similar (Pediocactus bradyi, discovered in Arizona in 1958 and which only occurs there). It was not until 1979 that botanist Ken Heil recognized P. winkleri as a new species. The Winklers had noticed the cactus during a vacation to Capitol Reef. Upon returning home to New Mexico, Mrs. Winkler sent a letter to local botanist Ken Heil along with a picture and habitat description. Heil had started to undertake botanical work in southern Utah and located the population based on Mrs. Winkler's description.

Since the intention of the author was to honor Mrs. Agnes Winkler (see the "New in 2012" section and specifically the first 2/17/12 entry on the What's New page of the Utah Rare Plant Guide ), its specific epithet should have been "winklerae."  Because that intent was not specifically outlined in the original description, changing the name to "winklerae" may require a formal committee request rather than relying on Article 60.11 of the International Code of Botanical Nomenclature  which would allow for correction if the intent was clear.

In 1999 David Hunt listed the cactus as a provisionally accepted taxon under the name of Pediocactus bradyi ssp. winkleri in the Second Edition of the CITES Cactaceae Checklist.   DNA analyses conducted to date however have shown that neither Pediocactus despainii nor this taxon are related to Pediocactus bradyi and that both P. despainii and P. winkleri are likely more closely related instead to P. simpsonii.  

P. winkleri was listed as a threatened species under the Endangered Species Act on August 20, 1998. As with many other cactus species, its most serious threat relates to poaching by plant collectors (but is also threatened by off-road vehicle use). Cacti such as P. winkleri should only be grown from legitimately obtained seed or plants legally grown from seed and should never be taken from the wild.

References

External links
 Desert Tropicals
 USDA PLANTS Profile
 State of Utah Natural Resources
 Utah Rare Plant Guide
 Utah Rare Plant Guide 2012 What's new section
 Utah Native Plant Society

Cacti of the United States
Flora of Utah
Endemic flora of the United States
winkleri